"Hold Me" is a single by British-American rock group Fleetwood Mac. The song was the first track to be released from the album Mirage (1982), the thirteenth album by the band. Lindsey Buckingham was main producer with Richard Dashut and Ken Caillat. Christine McVie and Buckingham were the lead vocalists.

Background
"Hold Me" was written by Christine McVie and Robbie Patton. During one of the recording sessions, guitarist Lindsey Buckingham suggested that he and McVie perform "Hold Me" as a duet similar to "Don't Stop". The two vocalists sang their parts with the studio windows open over the Paris countryside.

Cash Box said that "the catchy hook, the solid rhythm and, of course, the female harmonies all come together in a package that can’t beat."  Billboard called it a "buoyant midtempo love song."

Released in June 1982 in advance of the album itself, the song became one of Fleetwood Mac's biggest hits in the United States, peaking at  4 for a then-record seven consecutive weeks, from July 24, 1982, to September 4, 1982. (Potential higher chart placement was prevented by songs including "Eye of the Tiger" by Survivor and "Abracadabra" by the Steve Miller Band, as well as the No. 2 peaking of "Hurts So Good" by John Cougar.) "Hold Me" ranked at No. 31 on the Billboard Year-End Hot 100 singles of 1982.

In the United Kingdom, "Hold Me" was released in July 1982, but failed to chart despite respectable publicity. The song was eventually re-issued in February 1989 to promote the group's Greatest Hits (1988) package with "No Questions Asked" as the B-side. It reached No. 94.

The song is also included on the 2002 US version, and 2009 UK re-issue of the greatest hits album The Very Best of Fleetwood Mac.

Music video
The music video for "Hold Me" features the band in a surreal scenario set in a desert, based on several René Magritte paintings. In the video, Christine McVie is in a room surrounded by paintings, using a telescope to search for Lindsey Buckingham in the desert. Buckingham discovers Stevie Nicks lying on a chaise longue and paints a portrait of her. In other scenes, John McVie and Mick Fleetwood are archaeologists, dressed in khaki shorts and pith helmets. They find the desert littered with broken mirrors, which serve as a motif in the video, along with partially buried pianos, electric guitars, bass guitars, and other instruments.

Due to the band members' strained relationships at the time, the video shoot in the Mojave Desert was a "nightmare," according to producer Simon Fields. "[They] were, um, not easy to work with," agrees Steve Barron, who directed the clip. Most scenes feature only one or two band members at a time and the entire band is never seen together.

"It was so hot, and we weren't getting along," recalls Nicks. Buckingham was still not over their breakup six years earlier, nor her subsequent affair with Fleetwood. Further, she elaborates, the rest of the band was angry with Fleetwood because he had then begun an affair with Nicks' best friend, who left her husband as a result, causing serious issues for Nicks.

"Four of them, I can't recall which four, couldn't be together in the same room for very long. They didn't want to be there," says Barron. "Christine McVie was about ten hours out of the makeup trailer. By which time it was getting dark." According to Fields, "John McVie was drunk and tried to punch me. Stevie Nicks didn't want to walk on the sand with her platforms. Christine McVie was fed up with all of them. Mick thought she was being a bitch, he wouldn't talk to her."

Track listing
7-inch single (US) (Warner Bros / 7-29966)
A. "Hold Me" — 3:42
B. "Eyes of the World" — 3:41

12-inch promotional single (US) (Warner Bros / PRO-A-1040)
 "Hold Me" — 3:42 (both sides)

Personnel
 Lindsey Buckingham – twelve-string acoustic guitar, electric guitar, lead (in unison with C. McVie) and backing vocals
 Christine McVie – piano, Yamaha CP30 electric piano, lead (in unison with Buckingham) and backing vocals
 John McVie – bass guitar
 Mick Fleetwood – drums, tambourine, congas

Charts

Weekly charts

Year-end charts

References

Bibliography
The Great Rock Discography, Martin C. Strong, p. 378. (2000),

External links
 Official Charts Company.com – UK chart information
 Official site

1982 singles
Fleetwood Mac songs
Songs written by Christine McVie
Songs written by Robbie Patton
Song recordings produced by Ken Caillat
Song recordings produced by Richard Dashut
Music videos directed by Steve Barron
Warner Records singles
1981 songs
Male–female vocal duets